Munikovo is a rural locality (a village) in Vokhtozhskoye Rural Settlement, Gryazovetsky District, Vologda Oblast, Russia. The population was 17 as of 2002.

Geography 
Munikovo is located 76 km east of Gryazovets (the district's administrative centre) by road. Melenka is the nearest rural locality.

References 

Rural localities in Gryazovetsky District